Mac Buttram (born July 5, 1947) is an American politician who served in the Alabama House of Representatives from the 12th district from 2010 to 2014.

References

1947 births
Living people
Republican Party members of the Alabama House of Representatives